The First Nations Information Governance Centre (FNIGC) is an Ontario, Canada-based non-profit organization working in the field of First Nations data sovereignty. The organization is known for its comprehensive national surveys, which include the First Nations Regional Health Survey (FNRHS), and focus on the health and socio-economic conditions of First Nations people in Canada.

History
In 1996, the Assembly of First Nations (AFN) provided a mandate for a national First Nations and Inuit health survey. A National Steering Committee (NSC) was thus formed. In 2000, the NSC transitioned into the First Nations Information Governance Committee at the AFN. In 2009, the AFN Chiefs-in-Assembly passed a resolution (Resolution #48, December 2009) which mandated the creation of the First Nations Information Governance Centre, an independent non-profit to replace the First Nations Information Governance Committee. On April 22, 2010 the First Nations Information Governance Centre was incorporated as a non-profit entity.

Work

FNIGC has ten First Nations regional partners that collectively conduct the First Nations Regional Health Survey (FNRHS), the First Nations Early Childhood, Education and Employment Survey (FNREEES), the First Nations Community Survey (FNCS), and the First Nations Labour and Employment Development Survey (FNLED). These surveys look at physical and mental health, employment and income, housing, and other socio-economic factors influencing the health and well-being of First Nations people in Canada and have been widely cited in academic publications and policy documents.

FNIGC also provides a variety of education and training services related to the First Nations Principles of OCAP (which stands for ownership, control, access and possession), a foundational set of guidelines that establish how First Nations data and information will be collected, protected, used, or shared.

Further reading

References

External links

History of indigenous peoples of North America
Indigenous organizations in Canada
Non-profit organizations based in Canada